Allocotoceras is an endocerid from the Lower Ordovician (upper Canadian) Karmberg Formation of Australia (Tasmania), included in the Endoceratidae, based on small, straight or gently curved siphuncles.

Septal necks, according to Teichert, 1964, are holochoanitic, reaching to the previous septum. Endocones are described as having a dorsal wedge, or process, making the internal opening, or endosiphocone, semicircular in cross section.  In this sense Allocotoceras seems to resemble the genus Najaceras.

References

Further reading 
 
 Teichert, C. 1964. Endoceratoidea. Treatise on Invertebrate Paleontology, Part K. Endoceratoidea, Actinoceratoidea, Nautiloidea. Geological Soc. of America and Univ. Kansas Press

External links 
 Allocotoceras -Paleodb

†
Ordovician cephalopods of Oceania
Ordovician Australia
Darriwilian
Fossils of Australia
Paleontology in Tasmania
Fossil taxa described in 1953